Hydraschema is a genus of beetles in the family Cerambycidae, containing the following species:

 Hydraschema cribripennis Lane, 1966
 Hydraschema fabulosa Thomson, 1864
 Hydraschema leptostyla Lane, 1938
 Hydraschema mirim Martins & Galileo, 1998
 Hydraschema obliquevittata (Lane, 1966)
 Hydraschema petila Martins & Galileo, 1998
 Hydraschema veruta Lane, 1966
 Hydraschema villiersi Lane, 1965

References

Aerenicini